Jean Andeka (born in Gombe) is a politician in the Democratic Republic of the Congo and was a candidate in the 2011 presidential election. He is a practicing lawyer in Gombe, graduated from the University of Kinshasa, and was the first candidate to file for election.

References

Sources
Jean Andeka

Living people
People from Gombe State
Democratic Republic of the Congo politicians
Candidates for President of the Democratic Republic of the Congo
Year of birth missing (living people)
21st-century Democratic Republic of the Congo people